Chamoim e Vilar (officially, União das Freguesias de Chamoim e Vilar) is a Portuguese freguesia ("civil parish"), located in the municipality of Terras de Bouro in the district of Braga. The population in 2011 was 440, in an area of 12.57 km2.

History 
It was formed in 2013, under a national administrative reform, by the aggregation of the former parishes of Chamoim and Vilar.

References 

Parishes of Terras de Bouro